2019 Mogadishu bombing may refer to: 
 
4 February 2019 Mogadishu bombing
28 February 2019 Mogadishu bombings
22 July 2019 Mogadishu bombing
24 July 2019 Mogadishu bombing
December 2019 Mogadishu bombing